Izya Abramovich Gershtein (Russian Изя Абрамович Герштейн; born on 22 June 1923 in Kiev, USSR – 13 February 2013 in Haifa, Israel) was a notable Kyrgyz Soviet documentary filmmaker, cameraman and director.  People's Artist of Kyrgyz SSR, Honoured Culture Worker of Kyrgyz SSR (1974), Lenin Komsomol Prize Laureate.

Biography 

In 1941 and 1942 he worked as a technician at the Aktyubinsk power plant. In 1942 became an assistant cameraman at the Frunze "Sibtechfilm" news and documentary film studio.

Later in 1942 he started working at the Kyrgyzfilm studio, eventually becoming a director. Directed (and often wrote the screenplays) the following documentary films (a short list) "Right flank man"  (Russian «Правофланговый») (1960),  "Three answers for the mountains" (Russian «Три ответа горам») (1963), "Shift" (Russian «Смена») (1964),  "Boomerang" (Russian «Бумеранг») (1965), "There, past the mountains, lies the horizon" (Russian «Там, за горами, горизонт») (1966), "Cape of the bay runner" (Russian «Мыс гнедого скакуна») (1966), "Chingiz Aitmatov" (Russian «Чингиз Айтматов») (1968), "Pamir – the roof of the world" (Russian «Памир — крыша мира») (1969), "A happy man" (Russian «Счастливый человек») (1972), "Why the reward?" (Russian «За что премия?») (1973), "Sheepherders" (Russian «Чабаны») (1977), "Farewell, windmill" (Russian «Прощай, мельница») (1978), "Four portraits" (Russian «Четыре портрета») (1979), "For sale to demolish" (Russian «Продаётся на слом») (1982; Winner of the Oberhausen International Short Film Festival prize, 1983) and others.

His work is characterized by a sharp journalistic vision and an expressive editing style.

Emigrated to Israel in the second half of the 1990s.

Gershtein died on 13 February 2013, in Haifa, Israel.

Filmography 
Most notable works

(1960–1983)

(2000)

Encyclopedic mentions 
 Cinema: An encyclopedia glossary (Russian Кино: Энциклопедический словарь)/S.I. Yutkevich; Y.S. Afansiev, V.E. Baskakov, I.V. Weisfeld, Small Soviet Encyclopedia, 1987.- 640 pages., 96 photographs.
 Soviet filmmaker association guide, 1981 edition.

References

External links 
 A University of Toronto research on I. Gershtein
 St. Michaels College at University of Toronto film collection
 Worldcat Identities – Kyrgyzstani cinema
 An article in the "Lechaim" magazine (in Russian)
 Kyrgyzfilm personalities (in Russian)
 Award winning films at Kyrgyzfilm (in Russian)
 Russian Jewish Encyclopedia (in Russian)

1923 births
2013 deaths
Film people from Kyiv
Ukrainian Jews
Soviet film directors
Soviet screenwriters
Male screenwriters
People's Artists of Kyrgyzstan
Ukrainian emigrants to Israel